Frontier High School (FHS) is a public American high school in Bakersfield, California.  The school is part of the Kern High School District since its opening in 2006.  Its campus is located on the corner of Allen Road and Olive Drive in Northwest Bakersfield.

History
Frontier High School was founded prior to the 2006-2007 academic year, opening its doors only to incoming freshmen and sophomores. The first day of class was held August 21, 2006. Frontier's first graduating class was the Class of 2009. 

The school's newspaper publication, entitled the Titan Tribune, posted stories and events online until 2011. It currently does not run a newspaper.

Academics

FHS provides the following AP courses:
 AP European History
 AP Psychology
 AP U.S. History
 AP Calculus
 AP English Literature and Composition
 AP English Language and Composition
 AP French Language
 AP Spanish Language
 AP Government

Athletics

Mike Gibson is the FHS athletic director.  FHS sports teams are called the Titans, and have their home games on campus.  The Titans participate in the Southwest Yosemite League (Div. II, CIF Central Section) and have varsity, junior varsity, and frosh/soph teams. The Titan Girls' golf and soccer teams have won the California Interscholastic Federation championship in both.

In 2010, Frontier won the Valley Championship in baseball in the (Div. II, CIF Central Section) playoffs Its football team also hosted the Valley Championship in the (Div. II, CIF Central Section) playoffs.

The sports FHS participates in, and their respective levels are:
 Varsity, JV & frosh/soph – Football, Volleyball, men's basketball, women's basketball, baseball, softball, cross country
 Varsity and JV – Women's tennis, women's soccer, wrestling, men's tennis, cheerleading, men's soccer, swimming, track and field
 Varsity only – Men's Golf, women's golf, Men's Water Polo, Women's Water Polo

Notable alumni 
 Joseph Baena, Son of Arnold Schwarzenegger
Matt Darr, punter for the Miami Dolphins
Logan Gillaspie, Major League Baseball pitcher with the Baltimore Orioles
Cami Privett, former NWSL soccer player for the Houston Dash

External links

Educational institutions established in 2006
High schools in Bakersfield, California
Public high schools in California
2006 establishments in California